Ojo de Buey is a Latin reggae band that fuses Afro-Caribbean rhythms with Latin American sounds and lyrics that seek to convey positive messages. The lyrics to their songs talk about everyday life, love, personal struggles and reality. Using reggae as a root, fusion is an important component of the group's essence. Afro-Caribbean rhythms, Latin elements, rock'n roll overtones and positive messages in their lyrics, give a fresh air to their compositions and a flavor that invites movement.

History  
The Ojo de Buey band was created in 2007 as a project between friends to play at a party. From the beginning, playing live was the reason for the band's existence. The name comes from the seed known in Costa Rica as "Ox Eye" which has a very unique shape and is a symbol of good luck. Ojo de Buey goes through a metamorphosis and little by little the band integrates a more Latin flavor in their pieces, mixing it with the already prevailing trend to reggae. The result: an introspective balance that allows the group, and its members, to acquire strength, movement and direction. Spaces are opened to compose and write their own songs and the original repertoire begins to be the center of attention. In 2010, the band began to record their first album in a house in Playa Herradura, Costa Rica, in a place where the true feeling of the band was reflected. After 10 days of recording and coexistence, the process continued in Los Angeles, where various details were retouched and the horn section was recorded. Mixing and mastering were also done in Los Angeles, achieving a very professional sound without losing the essence of the performance. "Sabor en un tiempo cruel" became their debut album in 2011,featuring Twelve songs. 

Bullseye focuses on justice, freedom, love, heartbreak, etc. With this way of feeling and living music, Ojo de Buey performed at various festivals and countries, achieving great recognition and, also, sharing the stage with renowned international bands.

Awards 
 ACAM Award Best Reggae Album 2011–2012 
 International Arts Festival 2012 With Prophetic Culture and Sweetness 2011–2012 
 Universities Tour "Saving our planet" 2012 
 Pitaya Fest Nicaragua 2012 
 SOJA Everything Changes Toru 2011, Panama 
 Moonshine Fest 2011 El Salvador 
 Inauguration of the National Stadium Costa Rica 2011 
 National Festival of Arts 2011 
 Red Sunset Festival Mundoloco 2010 – Revelation Group
 IRIE Fest 2010 
 Espinar Festival 2010 
 Billabong World Sufring Games CR 2009

Style and lyrical themes 
Ojo de Buey has been described as roots reggae. The group has often made use of the moog synthesizer, an instrument commonly used in traditional reggae but is generally rare in contemporary reggae. Despite primarily performing reggae music, the group incorporates various other rhythms into its compositions, including those of Caribbean genres such as salsa. The song "Reggae Rústico" from Ideas Nuevas includes an extended soneo, an improvised call-and-response section common in the salsa genre, at its closing, calling for unity in reggae music.

Discography

Singles 

 Me hierve la sangre (2011)
 Ya no (2013)
 Dime la verdad (2011)
 No seas así (2017)
 No puedo dormir (2013)
 Nadie me para (2013)
Is This love ft Kafu Banton (2016)
Una sola nación (2014)
Uppercut ft Blackdali (2020)

Band members

Current members 

 Cayeto—Bass guitar, Lead Vocals
 Bruno Carboni—Guitar, Bass guitar
 Fernán Gonzales—Piano, Keyboards
 LuisK—Guitar
 Victor Rojas—Organ, Keyboards
 Dago Rodríguez—Percussion
 Esteban Gonzales—Vocals
Andrés Cervilla—Vocals
Pablo Chaves—Trombone

References

External links
Ojo de Buey on Instagram

Costa Rican music